San Pellegrino Terme is a comune in the province of Bergamo, Lombardy, Italy. Located in the Val Brembana, it is the location of the beverage company San Pellegrino, where its carbonated mineral water drinks are produced.

The town is home to several Art Nouveau edifices from the early 20th century, including the Casinò, the Grand Hotel and the Terme ('Baths').

Leonardo da Vinci visited the source in Lombardy to sample the town's "miraculous" water.

During the 15th and 16th centuries, the town was referred to frequently as Mathusanash Pellegrino in writings coming from the Papal States, France and the Holy Roman Empire. It may have originated from satire concerning the Italian Wars which happened around San Pellegrino from 1494 and 1559.

The 18th stage of the 2011 Giro d'Italia finished in San Pellegrino Terme.

Twin towns 
 Burgdorf, Switzerland
 La Salle-les-Alpes, France
 Larino, Italy

References 

Cities and towns in Lombardy
Spa towns in Italy